Mohammed Faizal Padippura (born 28 May 1975) is an Indian politician and social worker who served as Member of Parliament, Lok Sabha from Union Territory of Lakshadweep from 2014 to 2023. He was elected as the party whip of the Nationalist Congress Party in the 16th Lok Sabha. In January 2023, Faizal and four others were sentenced to 10 years in jail in a case of attempt to murder. After this verdict, Mohammad Faizal was disqualified from Lok Sabha. The Ethics Committee of Lok Sabha took this decision. On 25th January, The High court of Kerala suspended the judgement of Kavaratti court against him. On January 30, The Election Commission of India deferred by-election for Parliamentary constituency in Lakshadweep after Kerala High Court passed an order on January 25 suspending the conviction.

Personal life 
Mohammed Faizal was born on 28 May 1975 at Andrott, Lakshadweep to Mr. Pookoya Thangal Kunnamkalam and Mrs. Safiyabi Padippura. He is graduated with a bachelor's degree in zoology from Sir Syed College, Kannur in 1998, and earned a postgraduate Master of  Business Administration (MBA) degree from the University of Calicut in 2000. He married Rahmath Beegum on 19 September 2002 and the couple has four children, Fazna Bind Faizal, Ayisha Liyana, Ayisha Naveeda and SM Quthbudheen Bakthiyar.

Career 
Mohammed Faizal PP was a social worker and business advisor before he was elected  to the Parliament of India. He is a member of the Nationalist Congress Party. In 2014, he was elected to the 16th Lok Sabha as the Member of Parliament for the Lakshadweep constituency. He campaigned on a platform of increasing employment, ensuring the livelihoods of fishermen, providing improved healthcare, improving the standards of life of the common man and promoting the island's tourist industry. During the period 2014–2016, he was a member of the Standing Committee on Transport, Tourism and Culture, and the Consultative Committee of the Ministry of Home Affairs.

In May 2019, he was re-elected as member of parliament to the 17th Lok Sabha representing Lakshadweep and is a member of Standing Committee on Personnel, Public Grievances, Law and Justice. On 13 September 2019, he became a member of the Consultative Committee of the Ministry of Minority Affairs.

Legal Issues
In January 2023, Mohammad Faisal was sentenced to ten years imprisonment. The verdict is that of the sessions court in Kavarathi. Four people, including Faisal, were accused in the violence during the 2009 elections.

References 

|-

External links 

 
 https://www.india.gov.in/my-government/indian-parliament/faizal-pp-mohammed
 http://loksabhaph.nic.in/Members/MemberBioprofile.aspx?mpsno=4786

Living people
21st-century Indian Muslims
Nationalist Congress Party politicians from Lakshadweep
India MPs 2014–2019
Lok Sabha members from Lakshadweep
1975 births
India MPs 2019–present